Stan Moody (born 14 September 2006) is a British snooker player from Halifax, West Yorkshire. In February 2023 he won the WSF World Junior Championship, and with it earned a two-year card on the World Snooker Tour starting with Snooker season 2023/24.

Early life
Moody, a pupil at Ryburn Valley High School in Sowerby Bridge, Yorkshire, started playing snooker in 2015 after first playing pool during a family holiday. From 2019, Stan began practicing snooker at Levels in Huddersfield. He won English national snooker championships at under-14, under-16 and under-18 levels.

Career
Moody was told that he had a great cueing action when playing Mark Allen in an exhibition match.

2021-22 season 
In January 2022 Moody marked his debut ranking event match, and first televised match, with a first-round win over the top-32 player Lu Ning at the 2022 Snooker Shoot Out, held at the Leicester Arena in Leicester, England. The win gained Moody plaudits from the likes of Jimmy White who described him as a “serious player”, and led to Moody being dubbed “a future star of the sport”. Speaking after the match Moody described the experience by saying “I was a bit nervous to start with but once I had potted a few balls I felt composed, I kept my nerve… It surprised me, how bright the TV lights were. The table was amazing, quicker than what I am used it. The crowd was good”. In the next round he lost to Oliver Lines in the lowest scoring shoot-out match of all time. Lines called it a “nightmare draw” for him because he and Moody practise regularly together at the Northern Snooker Centre in Leeds. In March 2022 Moody finished the season as the runner-up in the EPSB Under-21 Premier Development Tour standings to Burnley’s Lewis Ullah.

2022-23 season 
At the WSF Junior Snooker Championship held in Sydney, Australia in February 2023 Moody showed tremendous form, dropping just one frame in the round-robin phase of the competition with 3-0 wins over Zac Cosker and Christiano de Azevedo, and overcoming Devlen Brown 3-1. In the last 16 and quarter-finals he whitewashed Jayden Dinga and Jake Crofts 4-0. Moody defeated Ukrainian Iulian Boiko 4-3 in the semi-finals before winning the final 5-1 against Liam Pullen. With this win he was awarded a two-year place on the World Snooker Tour from the 2023–24 snooker season. That same month Moody reached the final of the WSF Championship in Sydney where he lost to Ma Hai Long.

He entered into the invitational 2023 Six-red World Championship held in Pathum Thani, Thailand in March 2023.

Personal life
Moody paid tribute to his father Nigel who helped him as a young snooker player and “ done everything for me, paid for everything, takes me everywhere and looks after me, does the things that people don’t see…I’m very grateful.” 2005 World Snooker Championship winner Shaun Murphy has been described as a mentor to Moody. Murphy said he was approached by the Moody family and “I was honoured to be asked [for the mentor role] because but for the guidance of senior pros when I was that young…I might not be here now. There is huge potential there.”

References

External links
 Stan Moody at eurosport.com

2006 births
Living people
English snooker players
People from Halifax, West Yorkshire 
Sportspeople from Halifax, West Yorkshire